Al-Ashraf Ala'a ad-Din Kujuk ibn Muhammad ibn Qalawun, better known as al-Ashraf Kujuk (also spelled Küchük), (1334 – September 1345) was the Mamluk sultan from August 1341 to January 1342. He was a young child on the throne, and real power was held by his regent Emir Qawsun, a senior aid to Kujuk's father Sultan an-Nasir Muhammad (r. 1310–41). When Qawsun was ousted in a mamluk revolt in late December 1341, Kujuk was deposed in the weeks after. Kujuk was later murdered at the age of nine as a result of the political intrigues in the sultanate.

Biography
Kujuk was born in 1334 to father Sultan an-Nasir Muhammad (r. 1310–41) and his Tatar wife Ardu. In August 1341, Kujuk, then five or six, was installed as sultan by the strongman of Egypt, Emir Qawsun, who served as his regent and in effect, held the reins of power. Kujuk was appointed following Qawsun's arrest and execution of Sultan al-Mansur Abu Bakr, Kujuk's elder half-brother and predecessor. Kujuk was removed from the throne on 21 January 1342 and replaced by his elder half-brother an-Nasir Ahmad after Qawsun was ousted and killed in a mamluk revolt.

After his deposition, Kujuk returned to the care of his mother in the women's quarters in the Cairo Citadel. During the reign of Kujuk's half-brother as-Salih Isma'il (r. 1342–1345), Kujuk was seen by as-Salih Isma'il and his mother as a potential contender for the throne. In August 1345, as-Salih Isma'il died of an illness that he had been suffering from for months. His mother accused Kujuk's mother of having used sorcery to cause as-Salih Isma'il's illness. As a result, Kujuk was murdered in September 1345 at the age of nine.

References

Bibliography

1334 births
1345 deaths
14th-century Mamluk sultans
Bahri sultans
Medieval child monarchs
Murdered Mamluk sultans
People of Tatar descent
Monarchs deposed as children